A bounded real sequence  is said to be almost convergent to  if each Banach limit assigns
the same value  to the sequence .

Lorentz proved that  is almost convergent if and only if

The above limit can be rewritten in detail as

Almost convergence is studied in summability theory. It is an example of a summability method
which cannot be represented as a matrix method.

References
 G. Bennett and N.J. Kalton: "Consistency theorems for almost convergence." Trans. Amer. Math. Soc., 198:23--43, 1974. 
 J. Boos: "Classical and modern methods in summability." Oxford University Press, New York, 2000.
 J. Connor and K.-G. Grosse-Erdmann: "Sequential definitions of continuity for real functions." Rocky Mt. J. Math., 33(1):93--121, 2003.
 G.G. Lorentz: "A contribution to the theory of divergent sequences." Acta Math., 80:167--190, 1948.
 .

Specific

Convergence (mathematics)
Sequences and series